The dice snake (Natrix tessellata) is a Eurasian nonvenomous snake belonging to the family Colubridae, subfamily Natricinae. It is also called water snake.

Brief description 

Females are bigger than males. Their color may vary from greyish green to brownish or almost black, with dark spots on the back. The belly is sometimes vividly coloured in yellow or orange, with black spots, very similar to dice, hence the name.

Biology 
Living mainly near rivers, streams and lakes, it frequently feeds on fish. Sometimes, it feeds also on amphibians such as frogs, toads, and tadpoles.

Classified as nonvenomous, N. tessellata produces a potent antihemorrhagin in its serum and has been said to produce a neurotoxin through a gland in its mouth. As a defence, it spreads a very bad-smelling secretion from its cloaca. Another defence mechanism is thanatosis, playing dead.

During the mating season (March–May), they congregate in large groups. Egg-laying is usually in July, and one clutch consists of 10–30 eggs. The young snakes hatch in early September.

Dice snakes hibernate from October to April in dry holes near the water.

Distribution 
The dice snake is found throughout much of Eurasia:
Afghanistan, Albania, Armenia, Austria, Azerbaijan, Bosnia and Herzegovina, Bulgaria, China, Croatia, Cyprus, Czech Republic, France, Georgia, Germany, Greece, Hungary,  India, Iran, Iraq, Israel, Italy, Jordan, Kazakhstan, Kyrgyzstan, Lebanon, Montenegro, North Macedonia, Pakistan, Poland, Romania, Russia, Serbia, Slovakia, Slovenia, Switzerland, Syria, Tajikistan, Turkmenistan, Turkey, Ukraine, Uzbekistan, and Yemen. The species is also present in Egypt.

Research projects 
One of the most numerous populations lives in the vicinity of the ruins of Histria, in the Dobruja region, Romania. This population has been recently discovered to be threatened by a parasitic nematode of the genus Eustrongylides. Since 2005, the population from Histria has been receiving researchers' attention. For example, a joint Romanian–Swedish–Czech research program is focused on population biology studies and parasitic threats of this unique coastal population. An overview on Biology, Distribution and Conservation is given by Mebert (2011).

References

External links

 List of reptiles of Italy

Natrix
Reptiles of Europe
Reptiles of Azerbaijan
Reptiles of China
Reptiles of Pakistan
Reptiles described in 1768
Snakes of Jordan
Reptiles of Russia